The 2021–22 UMass Minutemen basketball team represented the University of Massachusetts Amherst during the 2021–22 NCAA Division I men's basketball season. The Minutemen were led by fifth-year head coach Matt McCall and played their home games at the William D. Mullins Memorial Center in Amherst, Massachusetts as members of the Atlantic 10 Conference. They finished the season 15–16, 7–11 in A-10 play to finish in 10th place. They defeated George Washington in the second round of the A-10 tournament before losing to Dayton in the quarterfinals. 

On March 2, 2022, the school fired head coach Matt McCall. On March 25, the school named former Kansas State and South Carolina head coach Frank Martin the team's new head coach.

Previous season
The Minutemen finished the 2020–21 season 8–7, 6–4 in A-10 play to finish in a tie for fourth place. In the Atlantic 10 tournament they defeated Saint Joseph's in the second round before losing to Saint Louis in the quarterfinals.

Departures

Incoming transfers

2021 recruiting class
There were no incoming recruits for the class of 2021.

Roster

Source

Schedule and results

|-
!colspan=9 style=| Non-conference regular season

|-
!colspan=9 style=| A-10 regular season

|-
!colspan=12 style=| A-10 tournament

Source

References

UMass Minutemen basketball seasons
Umass
UMass Minutemen basketball
UMass Minutemen basketball
University of Massachusetts Amherst